The Ghomara (Ighmarn) are a group of tribes in northern Morocco of about 12,000 people, living between the rivers Oued Laou and Ouringa, east of Chefchaouen and south of Tetouan, in the Western Rif. The river Tiguisas runs through their territory.

Originally, Ghomaras were a Berber tribal group belonging to the Masmuda confederacy. While most have shifted to speaking Arabic, a minority continue to speak the Berber Ghomara language.

Tribes 
The Ghomaras are traditionally divided into nine tribes:
 Ziat
 Zejel
 Selman
 Bu Zra, partially Berber speaking tribe
 Mansur, partially Berber speaking tribe
 Grir
 Smih
 Rezin
 Khaled

Bibliography
 G. Camps & J. Vignet-Zunz, "Ghomâra", Encyclopédie berbère, vol.20, 1998, pp. 3110–3119
 Jamal el Hannouche, "Arabic influence in Ghomara Berber", Leiden University, 2010.
 Jamal el Hannouche, "Ghomara Berber, a brief grammatical survey", Leiden University, 2008.
 Peter Behnstedt,"La frontera entre el bereber y el árabe en el Rif", Estudios de dialectología norteafricana y andalusí vol. 6, 2002.
 Georges Séraphin Colin, "Le parler berbère des Ghomara", Hesperis 9, 1929, pp. 43–58.

References

Arabized Berbers
Berber peoples and tribes
Rif
Berbers in Morocco